The Electoral Affairs Commission (EAC) is the body, established under the Electoral Affairs Commission Ordinance, that oversees electoral matters in Hong Kong. Its main functions include considering or reviewing the boundaries of Legislative Council geographical constituencies and constituencies of the 18 District Councils for the purpose of making recommendations, and overseeing the conduct and supervision of elections and regulating the procedures at an election. It is also responsible for supervision of the registration of electors and the promotional activities relating to registration.

History 
In 1997, the EAC succeeded the former Boundary and Election Commission, which was established on 23 July 1993. It is headed by a chairman, a position which has always been filled a High Court (formerly known as Supreme Court) judge.

Chairman

See also
Boundary commission
Election management body

References

Elections in Hong Kong
Hong Kong